Ruslan Mykhailovych Demchenko (born 15 July 1965) is a Ukrainian diplomat. He is an adviser to the President of Ukraine.

First Deputy Secretary of the National Security and Defense Council.

Biography 
Demchenko studied International relations at the University of Kyiv. He worked as the 2nd Secretary of the Ukrainian Embassy in Washington.

From 2000 to 2003, he was Consul General of Ukraine in Istanbul.

From 2003 to 2005, he served as Ambassador of Ukraine to Serbia and Montenegro.

From 2005 to 2006, he led the State Protocol Service of the President of Ukraine.

From 2006 to 2010, Demchenko was the Head of the Office of the President of Ukraine.

From 2010 to 2014, he was First Deputy Minister of Foreign Affairs of Ukraine.

Awards 
 Order of Prince Yaroslav the Wise, 5th class (2010).
 Order of Merit, 3rd class (2019).

References

External links 
 

1965 births
Living people
20th-century diplomats
21st-century diplomats
Presidential advisors
Diplomats from Kyiv
Taras Shevchenko National University of Kyiv, Institute of International Relations alumni
Ambassadors of Ukraine to Serbia and Montenegro
Recipients of the Order of Prince Yaroslav the Wise, 5th class
Recipients of the Order of Merit (Ukraine), 3rd class